Yidu is a county-level city in western Hubei Province, China. It is under the administration of the prefecture-level city of Yichang. Its GDP in 2015 was 50 billion yuan.

Yidu was established as a county in 196 BC during the Western Han dynasty, then called Yidao. In 210 AD, Liu Bei established Yidu Commandery.

Administrative divisions

The only subdistrict is Lucheng Subdistrict

Towns:
Honghuatao, Gaobazhou, Niejiahe, Songmuping, Zhicheng, Yaojiadian, Wuyanquan, Wangjiafan

Townships:
Panjiawan Tujia Ethnic Township

Climate

References

County-level divisions of Hubei
Geography of Yichang
Populated places on the Yangtze River
Cities in Hubei